Austrophryno is a genus of flies in the family Tachinidae.

Species
 Austrophryno diversicolor Townsend, 1916

Distribution
Australia

References

Exoristinae
Tachinidae genera
Diptera of Australasia
Monotypic Brachycera genera
Taxa named by Charles Henry Tyler Townsend